Rudianto Soedjarwo (born 9 November 1971) is an Indonesian film director. He became popular after he directed a teens movie What's Up with Love? (2002).

Filmography
 Falling Star (Bintang Jatuh)
 Tragedy (Tragedi)
 What's Up with Love? (Ada Apa dengan Cinta?)
 The Seventh House (Rumah Ketujuh)
 Chasing the Sun (Mengejar Matahari)
 About Her (Tentang Dia)
 Nine Dragons (9 Naga)
 Suddenly Dangdut (Mendadak Dangdut)
 Wild (Liar)
 Goat Man (Kambing Jantan: The Movie)

Awards and nominations

External links

1971 births
Living people
Academy of Art University alumni
People from Bogor
Indonesian film directors